Mule Train is a 1950 American Western film directed by John English and written by Gerald Geraghty. The film stars Gene Autry, Sheila Ryan, Robert Livingston, Frank Jaquet, Vince Barnett and Syd Saylor. The film was released on February 22, 1950, by Columbia Pictures.

Plot

Prospectors have discovered a natural cement mine that yields material of astonishing durability. But greedy contractor Sam Brady (Robert Livingston) enjoys a monopoly on the transportation of crushed rock, which is being used to build a local dam. U.S. Marshal Gene Autry (Gene Autry), however, discovers that Brady has used this method before, and his dams always burst shortly after construction, flooding entire towns. Despite Brady's power, Autry campaigns to have the new dam made of cement.

Cast
Gene Autry as Gene Autry
Sheila Ryan as Carol Bannister
Robert Livingston as Sam Brady
Frank Jaquet as Clayton Hodges
Vince Barnett as Barber Mulkey
Syd Saylor as Skeeter
Sandy Sanders as Bud
Pat Buttram as Smokey Argyle
Gregg Barton as Keg Rollins 
Kenne Duncan as Latigo 
Roy Gordon as John MacKnight 
Stanley Andrews as Chalmers 
Robert Hilton as Bancroft 
Robert J. Wilke as Bradshaw
John Miljan as Judd Holbrook
Robert Carson as Bill Cummings
Pat O'Malley as Charley Stewart
John McKee as Wilson
Champion as Gene's Horse

References

External links
 

1950 films
American Western (genre) films
1950 Western (genre) films
Columbia Pictures films
Films directed by John English
American black-and-white films
1950s English-language films
1950s American films